Domestic noir is a literary subgenre within crime fiction. Though used earlier in discussion of the film noir subgenre, the term was applied to fiction in 2013 by the novelist Julia Crouch, who has been described by the crime writer, Elizabeth Haynes, as "the queen of domestic noir".  Crouch defined the subgenre in her blog:

Crouch's novels, Cuckoo, The Long Fall, Tarnished and Every Vow You Break, had previously been categorized as psychological thrillers, a label she felt inadequate: 'The engine driving my work is more an unravelling than the high octane roller coaster suggested by the word 'thriller'.'

The term was embraced by fellow novelists, including Rebecca Whitney in an article in the Independent newspaper, where she describes her own subject as 'the toxic marriage and its fall-out.' Whitney quotes Sophie Orme, Senior Editor at Mantle, on the appeal of Domestic Noir:

Another crime novelist, A.J.Waines, describes domestic noir in her blog:

The subgenre has also been labelled 'chick noir', though the novelist Luana Lewis has written that this term was 'viewed as offensive and degrading by many....The word “chick” inevitably implies female; or synonym for ‘not to be taken seriously'.'

Other women writing domestic noir include Erin Kelly, Araminta Hall, Paula Hawkins, Gillian Flynn, Elizabeth Haynes, Sabine Durrant, Natalie Young, Louise Millar, Paula Daly, Samantha Hayes, Louise Doughty, Julie Myerson, Jean Hanff Korelitz, A. S. A. Harrison and Lionel Shriver. There are also male writers of the subgenre, such as S. J. Watson and Tom Vowler.

References

Crime fiction
Literary genres